General Sir John William Collman Williams  (29 August 1823 – 21 July 1911) was a Royal Marines officer who served as deputy adjutant-general Royal Marines.

Military career
The son of Dr. John Williams of the Royal Navy, Williams was commissioned into the Royal Marines on 7 July 1842. He became assistant adjutant of Royal Marine Forces in November 1867, second commandant of the Royal Marine Artillery in April 1870 and commandant of the Royal Marine Artillery in October 1872. He went on to be deputy adjutant-general Royal Marines (the professional head of the Royal Marines) in September 1883 before retiring in August 1888.

He died in Hampshire on 21 July 1911.

References

 

1823 births
1911 deaths
Royal Marines generals
Knights Commander of the Order of the Bath
People from Walmer
Military personnel from Kent